Houanaine District is a district of Tlemcen Province in north-western Algeria.

References 

Districts of Tlemcen Province